The Government of Gujarat constituted the Gujarat Pollution Control Board (GPCB) on 15 October 1974 with a view to protect the environment, prevent and control the pollution of water in the State of Gujarat, that occupies a prominent niche in progressive and industrial development of the country. The Board has been over the years entrusted with the Central Acts and relevant Rules for pollution control as notified thereof from time to time.

GPCB has its Head Office in Gandhinagar, Gujarat and 27 Regional Offices in Ahmedabad, Bharuch, Bhavnagar, Godhra, Jamnagar, Mehsana, Rajkot, Surat, Vadodara and Vapi...

See also
 Ramesh Sumant Mehta
Awaaz Foundation Non-governmental organization in Mumbai India, works towards preserving and enhancing environment and for other socially oriented causes.

External links
Gujarat Pollution Control Board
Central Pollution Control Board
Ministry of Environment and Forest, Government of India
Forest & Environment Department, Government of Gujarat

State agencies of Gujarat
State pollution control boards of India
Environmental agencies of country subdivisions
Government agencies established in 1974
1974 establishments in Gujarat